Before the unification of the country by the Bagrationi dynasty in the 10th century, several Georgian states, such as Iberia and Colchis had managed to subsist between the Roman Empire (later Byzantine Empire in the West) and the Sassanid Empire (later replaced by the Umayyad and Abbasid Caliphates). Between the 11th and 15th centuries, the Kingdom of Georgia was a major regional power, which withstood invasions by the Seljuk Empire, Mongol Empire, and Timurid Empire, before its fragmentation and submission to the Ottoman and Safavid Empires. Many Georgians fought in the armies of the empires that ruled the country from the 16th century, be it the Safavids (and successive Afsharids and Qajars), the Russian Empire or the Soviet Union, and the nation kept a reputation for military valor and skill.  Since 1991, the newly independent Georgia has taken part in many conflicts: its conflicts with Russia culminated in the 2008 Russo–Georgian War, while its alliance with the United States led to Georgia's participation in the Afghan and Iraq Wars.

Antiquity

Kingdom of Iberia
Iberia (Georgian – იბერია,), also known as Iveria, was a name given by the ancient Greeks and Romans to the ancient Georgian kingdom of Kartli (4th century BC – 5th century AD), corresponding roughly to the eastern and southern parts of the present day Georgia. The term Caucasian Iberia (or Eastern Iberia) was used to distinguish it from the Iberian Peninsula, where the present day countries of Spain, Portugal and Andorra are located.

The Caucasian Iberians provided a basis for later Georgian statehood and along with Colchis (early western Georgian state) formed a core of the present day Georgian people.

Pompey's Georgian campaign

Pompey invaded Georgia in 65 BC after making the Kingdom of Armenia a vassal of Rome. He demanded vassalage from the Iberians, but the Iberians refused and instigated partisan resistance against Pompey. Roman troops were constantly ambushed in arboreous areas. A sizable number of women reportedly participated in this irregular warfare as well. Later in the same year, the Iberians fought a battle against Pompey's main force over the Aragvi river near Mtskheta, the capital of Iberia. Greek historian Plutarch referred to that engagement as a great battle and noted that Iberian casualties consisted of approximately 9,000 while more than 10,000 were captured by the Romans. After subduing Iberia, Pompey turned towards the Kingdom of Colchis and subjugated its various fortresses and local peoples on the way with both cunning diplomacy and the use of force.

Kingdom of Colchis

Its geography is mostly assigned to what is now the western part of Georgia and encompasses the present-day Georgian provinces of Samegrelo, Imereti, Guria, Adjara, Abkhazia, Svaneti, Racha; the modern Turkey’s Rize, Trabzon and Artvin provinces (Lazistan, Tao-Klarjeti); and the modern Russia’s Sochi and Tuapse districts. The Colchians were probably established on the Black Sea coast by the Middle Bronze Age.

War between Iberia and Armenia

The War between Armenia and Iberia (AD 51) is known chiefly through its description in Tacitus' Annals. Fearing usurpation by Rhadamistus, his father convinced him to declare war upon his uncle and claim the Armenian throne for himself. The Iberians invaded with a large army, and forced Mithridates to retreat into the fortress of Gorneas (Garni), which was garrisoned by the Romans under the command of prefect Caelius Pollio, a prefect, and Casperius, a centurion. Rhadamistus was unable to take the fortress even after and assault and a siege. Pollio, swayed by bribery from Rhadamistus, induced the Roman soldiers to threaten the capitulation of the garrison. Under this threat, Mithridates left the fortress in order to make peace with Rhadamistus. Rhadamistus then executed Mithridates and his sons, despite a promise of non-violence, and became King of Armenia. Of this usurpation, Tacitus wrote "Rhadamistus might retain his ill-gotten gains, as long as he was hated and infamous; for this was more to Rome's interest than for him to have succeeded with glory." Shortly after, the Iberians were expelled from Armenia by a rebellion of the Armenian nobility which was supported by the Parthian Empire. Both kingdoms would then take sides respectively during the Roman–Parthian War of 58–63.

Late Antiquity

Iberian–Sasanian Wars
In 327, Georgia adopted Christianity as its state religion causing tension to grow between its Zoroastrian neighbor. From 483 to 522, the then-Georgian king  Vakhtang I turned Georgia into a strong regional power. Persians referred to him as "Gorgasal", roughly translated to mean wolf, due to the helmet that he wore into battle being partially made of a wolf's head. Military ambitions grew during this period which was reflected by a large fighting force. However, refusing Persian supremacy over the region and allying with the Byzantine Empire the Iberians faced numerous hostile Sasanian incursions. This culminated in the defeat of the Iberians and their Armenian allies leaving the kingdom ravaged.

Iberian War

The Iberian War was a conflict between the Eastern Roman and Sassanid Empires over the Georgian kingdom of Iberia, which lasted from 526 to 532.  It began following a rise of tension between the two empires in the upper Mesopotamian and Transcaucasian regions, and an anti-Persian revolt in Iberia. The war ended with the signing of the Treaty of Perpetual Peace. Resulting in the Sassanids gaining possession of Iberia, and the Byzantines the region of Lazica. The treaty was broken with the start of the Lazic War nine years later.

Lazic War

In the Eternal Peace treaty signed between the Sassanid and Byzantine empires, the Sassanids considered Lazica a region within the sphere of influence of Byzantine and the Lazic king at the time (Tzath I) was granted baptism from Emperor Justinian I in Constantinople. Lazica became a protectorate of the Byzantine Empire, which led to a full-scale uprising in 541, supported by the Persian Shah Khosrow I. The revolt resulted in the Byzantine Empire losing control over the region.

This changed in 548 when the situation turned against the Persians as the Lazic people began to revolt against a Persian rule. This time with Byzantine support. The conflict ended with a status quo agreement made in 562, in which the Sassanids recognized Lazica as a vassal state of the Byzantine Empire.

Early middle ages

War with the Umayyad Caliphate

Georgia had a war with the Umayyad Caliphate under Marwan bin Muhammad from 735 to 737. After two years, the Georgians lost the war and the Umayyads razed several Georgian towns.

Middle Ages

Kingdom of Georgia

Georgia's power reached its peak in the years from 1180–1236, creating one of the strongest medieval kingdoms in west Asia, with the population of approximately 8 million people including peoples from vassals states and fielding a varying sizable army of 40,000 to some 90,000 troops at a time.

Byzantine–Georgian Wars

Territorial ambitions of the Byzantine Empire and the Kingdom of Georgia clashed multiple times in the years 1014–1208 AD. The Byzantine Empire invaded the Kingdom of Georgia losing the first major battle but ultimately recovered and forced the Georgian king to surrender lands after several more costly battles. Around that time the Georgians were also stuck in fighting off Seljuks and Arab invasions. The Byzantines gained a number of dominions but as soon as the Georgians regained power and resources under Queen Tamar they reconquered all territories including Tao-Klarjeti and invaded Byzantium proper in order to help the Komnenos establish the Trebizond Empire.

Georgian–Seljuk wars
In 1118, under the rule of David the Builder, the Kingdom of Georgia underwent several decisive military reforms, which among other resulted in the creation of a large royal guard detachment of about 5000 horsemen. The king personally directed the training and equipment of the army. This new type of force was to stand up to the regional Seljuk foothold, and then go over to a methodical offensive with the aim of expelling the Seljuks first from Georgia and then from the whole Caucasus. During a period of 106 years, the Georgians won four great victories over the Seljuk Turks in the battles of Ertsukhi (1104), Didgori (1121), Shamkori (1195) and Basiani (1205) slowly eliminating their dominance over and presence in the region. This organization of the army created by David remained practically unchanged throughout the 12th century.

Battle of Didgori

The Battle of Didgori was fought between the armies of the Kingdom of Georgia numbering around 55,600 troops and the Seljuk Empire fielding over 300,000 troops of a greater coalition, at the fields of Didgori, 40 km west of Tbilisi (the modern-day capital of Georgia), on 12 August 1121. The battle resulted in King David IV of Georgia's decisive victory over the invading force under Ilghazi and the subsequent reconquest of a Muslim-held Tbilisi, which became the royal capital. The victory at Didgori inaugurated medieval Georgia's Golden Age and was celebrated in the Georgian chronicles as a "miraculous victory", while modern Georgians continue to remember the event as an annual September festival known as Didgoroba ("[the day] of Didgori").

Battle of Shamkor

On 1 June 1195 a 35,000 men strong Georgian army commanded by David Soslan, spouse of Tamar decisively beat an army of 70,000 men led by Atabeg Abu Bakr. The battle took place at the modern-day Shamkir District in Azerbaijan. Abu Bakr was eventually captured as prisoner after his retreat to Nakhichevan.

Battle of Basian
 
On 27 July 1202 the Georgian kingdom crushed a significantly larger Muslim coalition army of the Sultanate of Rum in the Basiani Vale, located 60 km northeast from Erzurum.

Mongol invasions of Georgia

The first appearance of the Mongols in the Caucasus occurred in 1220, when the Mongol generals Subutai and Jebe invaded Georgia. At the first contact the Mongols were seemingly repelled but it turned out to be a ruse. A Georgian army was sent to drive them out but the cavalry detachments of that force were lured into a trap resulting in most of them getting killed. The Mongols withdrew to pillage more lands in Persia and after resupplying, returned two months later to crush a hastily organized Georgian-Armenian army near Tbilisi. Subutai and Jebe then advanced northwards into Kievan Rus'.

Later in 1236, the Mongols launched a full-scale invasion of Georgia, along with the Empire of Trebizond and the Sultanate of Rum. They took the southernmost regions of the Georgian kingdom in Armenia, effectively annexing the state, while the Armenian Kingdom of Cilicia and certain Crusader states willingly gave into vassalage. Georgia enjoyed a short period of independence from the Mongols under king George V, though the Timurid invasions eventually led to its destruction.

Timur's invasions of Georgia

Georgia, effectively the only remaining Christian state in the Caucasus, was subjected, between 1386 and 1404, to several disastrous invasions by the armies of Turco-Mongol conqueror Timur, whose vast empire stretched, at its greatest extent, from Central Asia into Anatolia.

In the first of at least seven invasions, Timur sacked Georgia's capital, Tbilisi, and captured the king Bagrat V in 1386. Georgian resistance prompted a renewed attack by the Turco-Mongol armies. Bagrat's son and successor, George VII, put up stiff resistance and had to spend much of his reign (1395–1405) fighting the Timurid invasions. Timur personally led most of these raids to subdue the recalcitrant Georgian monarch. Although he was not able to establish a firm control over Georgia, the country suffered a blow from which it never recovered. George VII eventually signed a peace treaty with the Timurids, though at that time his kingdom consisted of little more than pillaged towns, ravaged countrysides and a shattered monarchy.

Turkoman invasions of Georgia

Following the death of Turco-Mongol ruler Timurlane, his empire began fragmenting into smaller states. One of these states was Kara Koyunlu, which took advantage of Georgia's still weakened state as a result of Timurs campaigns, and launched an invasion in which they killed the Georgian king George VII. The succeeding ruler, Constantine I allied himself with Shirvanshah Ibrahim I, however, he was defeated and taken captive in the Battle of Chalagan and was then executed along with 300 other Georgians. His successor Alexander I of Georgia retook Lori from the Turkomans, and encouraged the Armenian king Beskhen II Orbelian to attack them in the modern-day Syunik Province in southern Armenia. Victorious Alexander granted Beskhen the Lori province under the terms that he became a vassal. Jahan Shah of Kara Koyunlu consequently launched two invasions into Georgia in 1440 and 1444 due to Alexander's unwillingness to pay tribute to the Shah, sacking Tbilisi and other areas.
The Kara Koyunlu were destroyed by the Aq Qoyunlu, who were tribal kin to Kara Koyunlu and very similar in many ways. The Aq Qoyunlu took advantage of the fragmentation of Georgia and invaded several times under Prince Uzun Hasan. The Georgians eventually allied themselves with the founder of the Persian Safavid dynasty Ismail I and defeated the Aq Qoyunlu, putting an end to their invasions.

Georgian Mamluks

Georgian Mamluks in Egypt

In the thirteenth century, Egyptians began recruiting mainly Christians of Georgia and Circassia as slave soldiers called Mamluks.

Georgian Mamluks in Iraq

At the start of the eighteenth century, Georgian Mamluks based in Iraq asserted autonomy from the Ottoman Empire and founded a dynasty which ruled an autonomous Iraq until 1831, when the Ottomans reimposed direct rule.

Notable Georgian-Mamluk leaders of Iraq:
Hasan Pasha (1704–1723)
Ahmad Pasha (1723–1747) son of Hasan
Sulayman Abu Layla Pasha (1749–1762) son of Ahmad
Omar Pasha (1762–1776) son of Ahmad
Sulayman Pasha the Great (1780–1802) son of Omar
Ali Pasha (1802–1807) son of Omar
Sulayman Pasha the Little (1807–1813) son of Sulayman Great
Said Pasha (1813–1816) son of Sulayman Great
Dawud Pasha (1816–1831)

Early modern period

Georgian–Safavid wars

Georgian–Ottoman wars

After the Mongol invasions and the collapse of the Kingdom of Georgia, from the 16th to the 19th century, Georgia fought against Persian, Ottoman, and Russian rule over the region in battles such as:
 Battle of Kiziki (1520)
 Battle of Teleti (1522)
 Battle of Garisi (1556)
 Battle of Digomi (1567)
 Battle of Partskhisi (1569)
 Battle of Nakhiduri (1600)
 Battle of Tashiskari (1609)
 Battle of Martqopi (1625)
 Battle of Marabda (1625)
 Battle of Bazaleti (1626)
 Battle of Khresili (1757)
 Battle of Aspindza (1770)

1795 Persian Invasion and fall of Tbilisi

In response to the Georgian King Heraclius IIs alliance with the Russian Empire that was established in 1783 by signing the Treaty of Georgievsk and his refusal to withdraw it in favor of Persian territorial ambitions the Iranian Emperor Agha Mohammad Khan Qajar sent several ultimatums and eventually declared war on Georgia sending an army in 1795 to subdue it. Amidst negotiations too weak to stand on its own Georgia turned to the Russian Empire repeatedly requesting military aid which was turned down due to political turmoil in Europe. Heraclius personally appealed to Empress Catherine the Great to pledge him a few thousand troops but he did not listen. In August 1795, a 70,000 men strong Persian army crossed the Aras to secure vassalage of the Ganja and Erivan khanates before reaching its main destination. Khan sent Heraclius his last ultimatum which was also rejected despite latter being aware that the Russian Empire has completely abandoned Georgia at that point. Khan led a 40,000 men strong force marches towards Tbilisi to engage a comparably insignificant Georgian army of around 5,000 troops in what is known as the Battle of Krtsanisi. From the Georgian nobility all but one refused to aid Heraclius. Some 2,000 troops of the Georgian force consisted of auxiliaries from the Kingdom of Imereti. Initially, Heraclius was successful in fending off the Qajar army until Armenian traitors informed Khan that the Georgians were short of manpower and in a weak state as the Iranians were about to withdraw their entire campaign. Aware of the new situation and using an artillery and cavalry duel as diversion, the Iranians were able to outflank the heavily outnumbered Georgians. Heraclius mounted a counterattack but was unable to prevail and forced to withdraw to his last defensive position while his retreat out of the city and to the mountains was covered by the remaining artillery and the Three Hundred Aragvians. After Khans victory Tbilisi was sacked and completely destroyed with most of its population massacred in the streets and 15,000 captives taken to Persia. Only a thousand men of Heraclius army survived with the Persians losing around 13,000 troops, almost a third of their force.

Absorption by the Russian Empire

In the 19th century, taking advantage of Georgia being ravaged by the Iranians the Russian Empire started to systematically annex single Georgian dominions in a 50 year struggle, until all of Georgia was absorbed into the empire. 
 In 1801 Russia ultimately betrays the Treaty of Georgievsk and occupies the Georgian Kingdom of Kartl-Kakheti.
 in 1810 Russia occupies the Kingdom of Imereti
 in 1829 Russia occupies the Principality of Guria
in 1858 Russia occupies the Principality of Svaneti
in 1864 Russia occupies the Principality of Abkhazia
 in 1867 Russia occupies the Principality of Mingrelia

Twentieth century

World War I
Georgia fought in the First World War as part of the Russian Empire. Out of a total population of 1.5 million, around 200,000 soldiers took part in the Imperial Russian war efforts. 1,500 soldiers fought on the side of Germany in the first Georgian Legion.

Georgian–Armenian War

A brief war erupted between the two newly established Caucasus republics over the control of bordering regions ending in a military stalemate with little political and territorial gains on either side and hundreds or possibly thousands of casualties.

Turkish–Georgian war

Georgian-Ossetian conflict

In 1918, Ossetian Bolsheviks launched an insurgency against Georgian authorities to secede the Tskhinvali District from the Georgian Democratic Republic and unify with Soviet Russia. On 23 March 1920 rebelling Ossetians formed their own South-Ossetian Revolutionary Committee. On 8 June the militants captured Tskhinvali. Many who stood in their way, amongst them prominent public figures, were executed. Tskhinvali was burned. This led to a full-scale military response by the Georgian government, which succeeded in crushing the rebellion. Consequently thousands of civilians in the region became refugees. Several thousand died of illness.

The Sochi conflict

In 1918, a three-sided dispute on whether the region of Sochi which was under Georgian-Abkhazian rule during previous centuries should be the border between Russia and Georgia, sparked a conflict over the control of the territory primarily between the Democratic Republic of Georgia, the SFSR and the White Movement. The Abkhazian nobility requested military aid from the Georgian government as Bolshevik forces were attempting to capture Sochi. Georgia responded by sending troops to repulse the Bolshevik incursion with aid of the Abkhazians resulting in the capture of all three major areas along the entire coastline as far as Tuapse while Sochi was secured. Initially the White Movement forces were considered allies by Georgia until their announcement of a Greater Russia including the entire Caucasus region as integral part. With Denikins forces pushing back the red army towards Tuapse the Georgians were forced to abandon the town but kept Sochi under their control which caused great protest among the White Movement leadership. In response Denikin conducted an unsuccessful siege of the town until the Georgian forces under General Konyev gave in to increasingly overwhelming numbers and were driven back as far as the Georgian town of Gagra. Before the Georgians were able to mount a counterattack, British representatives intervened resulting in the establishment of a temporary DMZ. After failed negotiations, joint Abkhaz-Georgian troops under Mazniashvili conducted a large scale offensive retaking Gagra after a bloody battle intended to move further but the operation was halted when a British contingent arrived in the capital of Georgia forcing the Georgian government to back down.

Red Army Invasion of Georgia

 
In 1921, Soviet Russian forces invaded and ultimately annexed the Democratic Republic of Georgia. Thousands of people were killed on both sides including civilians.

August Uprising

In 1924, thousands of Georgian freedom fighters (including people from Abkhazia) were killed while trying to fight the Soviet takeover and rule over their country. Over 10.000 people were consequently executed.

World War II
Although the Axis powers never penetrated the Georgian Soviet Socialist Republic (Georgian SSR), Soviet Georgia contributed almost 700,000 officers and soldiers (about 20% of the total 3.2–3.4 million citizens mobilized) to the war effort, of which approximately 300,000 were killed. 137 Georgians were awarded Hero of the Soviet Union having been the most numerous recipients of this award in the Caucasus. The country was also a vital source of textiles as well as one of the most important manufacturers for warplanes of almost all Soviet types, including the Yak-3, LA-5 and the LaGG-3.

Aside from Joseph Stalin and Lavrentiy Beria, who served under the Soviet Union, other prominent Georgian figures included Zakaria Bakradze, Valerian Tevzadze, Jerzy Tumaniszwili, Vasilij Shalvovich Kvachantiradze, Giorgi Abashvili, and Dimitri Amilakhvari. Another distinguished sniper was Noah Adamia, a key figure in the Siege of Sevastopol (1941–42).

Alexander Nadiradze, later a leading Soviet missile engineer, developed anti-tank shells during WW2. After being appointed chief of an OKB he took on various other projects. Nikoloz Muskhelishvili was a Soviet scientist whose theories and research in several fields contributed to the Soviet Union's general advancement in the development of military hardware, especially during WW2, and in the Cold War.

Around 30,000 volunteers and emigrants, but also captured Georgian Soviet soldiers, chose to fight for the Germans, in such units as:
 Georgische Legion (Georgian volunteers but also included volunteers from other peoples of the region)
 Freiwilligen-Stamm-Regiment 1 (Georgians volunteers)
 SS-Waffengruppe Georgien (Georgian volunteers)
 I. Sonderverband Bergmann (2 Georgian, 1 Azeri and 2 North Caucasian battalions)

People joined the Axis for various reasons. Captured Soviet soldiers were forced to switch sides or die.

In the United States, Alexander Kartveli was an immigrant from Georgia who designed the P-47 Thunderbolt fighter plane. He experimented on and implemented jet engines into aircraft in 1944.

Texel Uprising

On 5 April 1945 the 882nd Infantry Battalion of the Georgian Legion under the command of Shalva Loladze revolted against the Germans on the island of Texel in the Netherlands in an effort to bring it under their control and surrender to the Allies. However they did not achieve total control of the island, and with reinforcements the Germans were able to seize the island back, rounding up and killing all but a few Georgians who were sheltered and hidden by the Dutch. 565 Georgians, 117 Dutch inhabitants, and about 800 Germans died in what is often described as the last battlefield in Europe.

Wars in the 1990s

South Ossetia War

The 1991-1992 South Ossetia War was a result of Ossetians' aim to secede South Ossetian Autonomous Oblast from Georgia during the collapse of Soviet Union. On 20 September 1990 South Ossetian People's Council declared establishing of the South Ossetian Soviet Democratic Republic. On 10 December Supreme Council of Georgia abolished South Ossetian Autonomy. The next day two Georgians and one Ossetian policeman were killed during the clashes between Georgians and Ossetians in Tskhinvali. On 5 January the unrest in the region drew into the war between Ossetian militants and Georgian Armed Forces. On 24 June 1992 the Sochi ceasefire agreement was signed marking the end of the South Ossetia War. On 14 July the Russian-Georgian-Ossetian peacekeeping force entered the Tskhinvali Region.

Georgian Civil War

Georgia declared independence from the Soviet Union on 9 April 1991. On 26 May the first presidential elections were held, which saw Zviad Gamsakhurdia, the leader of the liberation movement become first-ever president of Georgia. Nevertheless, tensions rose as the opposition of Gamsakhurdia strengthened, accusing him in establishing a dictatorship. On 19 August Prime Minister of Georgia Tengiz Sigua resigned and joined the opposition. The National Guard of Georgia also divided into supporters and opponents of Gamsakhurdia. On 24 August the Chief of National Guard Tengiz Kitovani and anti-Gamsakhurdia militants also turned towards the opposition. On 21 December Police raided the demonstrations in Tbilisi demanding Zviad Gamsakhurdia to resign. On 21 December rebellious parts of the National Guard of Georgia led by Tengiz Kitovani and paramilitary organization Mkhedrioni entered Tbilisi. The situation escalated into a civil war.

War in Abkhazia

 
Georgia declared independence from the Soviet Union on 9 April 1991. After gaining independence, Abkhazia and South Ossetia declared independence from Georgia, which led to a civil war in which Russia directly supported the Abkhazians. The conflict between Georgia and its separatist territories still has not yet been resolved. In 1992, Russia brokered a cease-fire agreement between the breakaway region of South Ossetia and Georgia, during their war in the early '90s. Later in 2008, Russia declared that it recognized South Ossetia as a sovereign nation alongside Nicaragua, Venezuela and Nauru.

21st century

From East to West
 

During the conflicts in the 1990s the Republic of Georgia relied mostly on ad hoc poorly armed and trained militia while maintaining just a small force of professional troops. The situation gradually improved with growing US assistance under president Shevardnadze first and moreso after the Rose Revolution. Georgia undertook a number of efforts and initiated reforms in order to upgrade the partially very outdated military hardware and retrain its troops on Western NATO standards and combat doctrines—which is also to be regarded symbolic to the countries steady political shift and general advance towards the West and EU. The number of servicemen increased from 15,000 at the lowest point to about 37,000 at its peak while consistently increasing infrastructural quality, instituting stable insurances and raising the average salaries. As a member of the Partnership for Peace initiative since 1994 and with the Georgia Train and Equip Program under the guidance and funding of the United States Georgian soldiers are able to conduct joint exercises with US troops including special forces. Since 2001 Georgia acquires moderate quantities of mostly Soviet-era armament from Ukraine, the Czech Republic, Poland etc. but also increasingly Western small arms from Israel and an amount of AR-15 type weapons from the United States that are primarily used for peacekeeping operations. However the bulk of the armed forces arsenal consists of mainly outdated Soviet weapons to this date.

The structure of the Land Forces is based on and to some extent modeled after NATO equivalents but largely organised with the unique territorial and strategic situation in mind. The Light Infantry presents the backbone of the armed forces and is being trained and retrained based on the United States Marine Corps doctrine of a quickly deployable and mobile fighting force. Georgian infantry trains and regularly participates in joint training and deployment exercises respectively with US Marines.
In 1999, the first NATO based special forces were formed with financial and material assistance from Turkey. From 2001 on, this mostly classified unit began training with special forces from various partner nations including Israel. The United States also got involved later in 2003 amidst the units first deployment to Iraq in the same year.

Domestic upgrades and Industry
 
Georgia established a state weapons research unit in the early-to mid 1990s later named "Delta". Starting with the development of protection gear such as personal armor and bomb disposal suits, the institute grew and upgraded over the years partially with US funding. During WW2 Georgia was essential for the production of military equipment ranging from ammunition to aircraft and during the Cold War period missiles and parts for satellites. Short of such capabilities nowadays the current industry is still able and responsible for providing the Georgian army with the majority of equipment for personnel and, to undisclosed extent, even vehicles and weapons.

Part of Kosovo Force

Georgian troops became part of the NATO led Kosovo Force in 1999 and remained there until 2008 with initially 34 personnel serving under Turkish command and later in 2003 150 soldiers under German command. The contingent was withdrawn in April 2008 as Georgia prepared to increase its military presence in Afghanistan.

Part of the Multi-National Force – Iraq

The first Georgian deployment in Iraq consisted of 70 personnel medical staff, a sapper unit and special forces who were stationed in Baiji, Iraq and served as QRF. The Georgian presence in Iraq steadily increased until it reached its peak in 2008 at brigade strength with around 2,300 soldiers. The mission was abandoned in August 2008 due to the war with Russia and the entire contingent transferred back to Georgia. A total of five soldiers died and 19 were wounded during their service in Iraq.

2008 War with Russia

In 2008, after a series of provocation and skirmishes from both sides the Georgian government attempted to restore constitutional order over the separatist region of South Ossetia by military force, following separatist attacks on Georgian villages. In the fighting Russian peacekeepers got involved and some of them killed which triggered a Russian response resulting in a brief large-scale conflict with hundreds of people killed, wounded and missing while tens of thousands were displaced. The Russian Federation actively supported the secession of both breakaway regions contradicting its own firm political stance on separatism. Currently, Russia occupies 20% of Georgian de facto territory with considerable military presence.

Involvement in Afghanistan

ISAF
Officially Georgia started to deploy troops in Afghanistan in 2004. The effort was then reinforced by a medical group in 2007. Military presence was further increased by conventional troops in 2009 and entire battalions from 2010 the peak deployment being over 1,500 troops in 2012. The bulk of the peacekeeping force is consistently stationed in the volatile Helmand province. Due to the rotational deployment of almost every single infantry battalion of the armed forces, the majority of Georgian soldiers thus have participated in an ISAF deployment. Amidst completion of the operation, the Special Mountain Battalion was deployed in 2014. A total of 30 soldiers have been killed and 435 wounded in the ISAF mission.

Resolute Support
To the current Afghanistan mission Georgia contributes with 870 troops..

Central African Republic

A reinforced company of around 140 Georgian soldiers took part in the 2014 EUFOR operation to protect Bangui, the capital of the Central African Republic and provided security for humanitarian aid convoys.

References

Military history of Georgia (country)
Military history